USS Essex may refer to the following ships in American naval service:

  was a 32-gun sailing frigate launched in 1799 and captured in 1814
Essex Junior was a British whaler captured by Essex and put into service until recaptured in 1814
 was an ironclad steamer during the American Civil War, sold in 1865
 was a wooden screw steamer launched in 1876 and sold in 1930
 was an  commissioned in 1942, which served through World War II, the Korean War, and Apollo 7 before being decommissioned in 1969
 is a  commissioned in 1992 and currently in active service

Other uses 
, a whaler that a sperm whale sank

United States Navy ship names